The Fire-Baptized Holiness Church was a holiness Christian denomination in North America and much of the denomination was involved in the early formation of Pentecostalism, the advent of which caused schism in the church; it continues today in the following denominations: International Pentecostal Holiness Church, Fire Baptized Holiness Church of God of the Americas, Bible Holiness Church and Wesleyan Holiness Alliance.

The Fire-Baptized Holiness Church was founded in 1896, being largely of a Methodist background, with Benjamin Wesley Young and Benjamin Hardin Irwin serving as leaders. Irwin, a Wesleyan Methodist elder taught belief in a baptism by fire (known in short as "the fire"), influenced by his reading of John William Fletcher, an early Methodist divine. 

The Southeastern Kansas Fire Baptized Holiness Association dissolved its relationship with the rest of the denomination in 1898 after Irwin began to preach the necessity of maintaining Jewish dietary laws; the Southeastern Kansas Fire Baptized Holiness Association renamed itself as the Fire Baptized Holiness Association of Southeastern Kansas in 1904 and then the Fire Baptized Holiness Church in 1945 and then the present-day name of Bible Holiness Church in 1995.

In 1908, most of the African-American members withdrew to form their own church, the Fire Baptized Holiness Church of God of the Americas. The majority of the original Fire-Baptized Holiness Church merged with the Pentecostal Holiness Church in 1911, forming a new denomination now known as the International Pentecostal Holiness Church. Prior to the merger, the Fire-Baptized Holiness Church was an interracial body.

History
The church was founded in 1896 by Rev. Benjamin Hardin Irwin of Lincoln, Nebraska. Irwin was educated as a lawyer but entered ordained ministry after he was converted in a Baptist church. After coming into contact with members of the Iowa Holiness Association, Irwin accepted holiness beliefs and claimed to experience entire sanctification in 1891. He was a student of the writings of John Wesley and John William Fletcher and eventually joined the Wesleyan Methodist Church. 

Irwin became convinced that there was an experience beyond sanctification called the "baptism with the Holy Ghost and fire" or simply "the fire". After receiving this experience in October 1895, he began to preach this "third blessing" among holiness adherents in the Midwest, particularly among Wesleyan Methodists and Brethren in Christ, a River Brethren denomination. His services were highly emotional with participants often getting the "jerks", shouting, speaking in tongues, and holy dancing and laughing. Thousands attended his meetings and his teaching was circulated widely within the holiness movement, with its greatest strength in the Midwest and South. His message was largely rejected, however, and was denounced as a "third blessing heresy". 

Because of opposition Irwin formed his own organization in 1895 called the Iowa Fire-Baptized Holiness Association at Olmitz, Iowa. As he traveled throughout the nation, he established associations to promote his message. By the time these associations were organized into one denomination in 1898, there were churches in eight American states and two Canadian provinces. An organizational convention was held in Anderson, South Carolina, from July 28 to August 28, 1898. The constitution of the Iowa Fire Baptized Holiness Association was accepted by the Neosha Valley Holiness Association in 1897 and it became the Southeastern Kansas Fire Baptized Holiness Association. William E. Fuller, an African-American minister who had left the African Methodist Episcopal Church, was elected to the church's general board and became the overseer of the black churches. The church was fully integrated with Southern whites and blacks openly worshiping together, despite stringent segregation laws. According to Synan, "All [(Pentecostal) statements for or against racial integration failed to obscure one important fact——the practical integration of poor whites and blacks in backwoods Pentecostal revival services" and this was "a type of race-mixing that has occurred in the South since before the Civil War." By 1900, Fuller had organized 50 black Fire-Baptized churches and a convention.

In 1900, Irwin confessed to "open and gross sin" which brought "great reproach" to the church. He resigned as general overseer and was replaced by Joseph H. King, a 31-year-old former Methodist from Georgia. The revelation of Irwin's failure greatly affected the church; several state associations collapsed.

The Southeastern Kansas Fire Baptized Holiness Association dissolved its relationship with the rest of the denomination in 1898 after Irwin began to preach the necessity of maintaining Jewish dietary laws; the Southeastern Kansas Fire Baptized Holiness Association renamed itself as the Fire Baptized Holiness Association of Southeastern Kansas in 1904 and then the Fire Baptized Holiness Church in 1945 and then the present-day name of Bible Holiness Church in 1995. The Bible Holiness Church dropped its belief in a third work of grace in 1948. In 1979, a schism regarding holiness standards occurred in the faction of the Fire Baptized Holiness Church that now calls itself the Bible Holiness Church, resulting in the formation of the Wesleyan Holiness Alliance. 

By 1906, King led the majority of the original Fire Baptized Holiness Church into third-blessing Pentecostalism, taking the line that the baptism in the Holy Spirit with evidence of speaking in tongues had been the "baptism of fire" the church had been seeking.  After 1908, the denomination split on racial lines when Fuller left, with the blessing of the white leadership, and started what would become the Fire Baptized Holiness Church of God of the Americas. In 1911, the church merged with the Pentecostal Holiness Church and took the latter organization’s name even though the Fire-Baptized church was larger. The body resulting from the merger would be renamed the International Pentecostal Holiness Church in 1975.

Theological distinctives
The church's beliefs were largely consistent with the Holiness movement; however, there were distinct doctrinal positions. Irwin taught of a third blessing that came after salvation and entire sanctification called the "baptism of fire." While speaking in tongues was not unheard of among the Fire-Baptized Holiness, it was not understood as the initial evidence of Spirit baptism. This idea was formulated by Charles Parham and only began to influence the Fire-Baptized Church as news of the Azusa Street Revival spread after 1906.   By 1900, Irwin also taught there were additional "baptisms of fire" he called baptisms of "dynamite", "lyddite", and "oxidite". This "chemical jargon" never took root within the church and was abandoned by Irwin's successors.

Other doctrines held by Irwin were also rejected after his departure. He, like other holiness Christians, was against women wearing "needless ornamentation". However, he also applied this prohibition to men, claiming that the wearing of neckties was sinful.  He also said it was a sin to eat anything forbidden by the dietary laws of the Old Testament.  As a result, the church was sometimes called "the no ties, no hog-meat people."

The belief in a third work of grace was rejected in 1948 by the faction of the Fire Baptized Holiness Church that now calls itself the Bible Holiness Church. The Bible Holiness Church is non-sacramental (reflective of its partial Quaker heritage) and its holiness standards include the prohibition of "alcohol, tobacco, drugs, secret societies, television, immodest clothing, and jewelry." The Bible Holiness Church teaches conscientious objection.

Structure
At the First General Council in Anderson, South Carolina, the church was organized with authority centralized in the General Overseer who held office for life. The General Overseer appointed Ruling Elders to oversee the churches in each state, and he could also make pastoral appointments.

For several decades there has continued to be a Pentecostal Fire Baptized Holiness Church.  There are churches in Alabama, Georgia, South Carolina, North Carolina and Virginia.

The Pentecostal Fire Baptized Holiness Church operates with a General Conference made up of five State Conferences (Alabama, Georgia, South Carolina, North Carolina and Virginia). There is a General Moderator that serves two-year terms, while State Moderator serves one-year terms with both having term limits.  There also are Assistants at both the General and State Conference Levels.

The faction of the Fire Baptized Holiness Church that now calls itself the Bible Holiness Church is headquartered in Independence, Kansas, and had forty-five congregations and eighty-three ministers in 2002. Its periodical, which has been in existence since 1934, is called The Flaming Sword. The Bible Holiness Church runs Independence Bible School and Troy Holiness School, established in 1948 and 1973, respectively. The Bible Holiness Church has missions in New Guinea.

References

 Vinson Synan and Woods, Daniel, Fire Baptized: The Many Lives and Works of Benjamin Hardin Irwin, (Lexington, Kentucky: Emeth Press, 2017), .

External links
Bible Holiness Church

Religious organizations established in 1895
Holiness organizations established in the 19th century
Pentecostal denominations in North America
Protestant denominations established in the 19th century
Holiness denominations
1895 establishments in Nebraska
Holiness pacifism